Charged multivesicular body protein 1b is a protein that in humans is encoded by the CHMP1B gene.

References

External links

Further reading